Loonalaid is a small island in the Baltic Sea belonging to the country of Estonia. Loonalaid lies just off the northwest coast of the island of Saaremaa, is administered by Saaremaa Municipality, Saare County and is also part of Vilsandi National Park.

Loonalaid is a windswept, rocky, low-lying 1 km2 islet west of Vilsandi in the westernmost part of Estonia. The islet is exposed to the Baltic Sea's predominantly westerly winds and weather systems. Historically, the area had many shipwrecks due to the winds, weather and numerous uncharted shoals. These were a hazard, particularly to ships accessing the Gulf of Riga, off the southern tip of Saaremaa.

During the days of serfdom, Loonalaid and adjacent areas of Saaremaa (called Oesel/Ösel by the Germans) belonged to the Loona Manor, owned by Baron Hoyningen-Huene. In 1830 Baron Huene sent a man by the name of Aadu All to live on Loonalaid, primarily to guard the hay that was grown there as feed for the manor's livestock and to prevent it from being stolen or burned. All, his wife and young son Peeter, who was 1 yr old at the time, became the islet's first residents and built a farmhouse. Peeter All became a seaman and businessman and eventually purchased the family farm from the Baron.

See also
 List of islands of Estonia

References

Estonian islands in the Baltic
Saaremaa Parish
Kreis Ösel